Treacherous may refer to:

 The Treacherous, a 2015 Korean film
 Treacherous, a 1993 film starring Tia Carrere and Adam Baldwin
 "Treacherous", a song from the 1988 album Smoke Some Kill by rapper Schoolly D
 "Treacherous" (Taylor Swift song), from the album Red

See also
 Alvin the Treacherous, a villain in the How to Train Your Dragon novel series